Arctotis is a genus of annual and perennial plants in the family Asteraceae.

Arctotis is native to dry stony slopes in southern Africa. Some of the plants are alternatively placed in the genus Venidium. The common name is "African daisy", or "Gousblom" in Afrikaans. These plants have daisy-like composite flowers which tend to close in the late afternoon or in dull weather, but numerous cultivars have been developed for garden use which stay open for longer, and are available in a wide range of colours. Tender perennials are often grown in temperate regions as half-hardy annuals.

The garden hybrid A. × hybrida hort. 'Flame' has gained the Royal Horticultural Society's Award of Garden Merit.  

Vigorous Arctotis hybrids like 'Pink Sugar' and 'Large Marge' are popular choices for garden design for the diverse colors of their blooms.

Species

References

External links

 
Asteraceae genera
Flora of Southern Africa
Taxa named by Carl Linnaeus